Mozzie may refer to:
 De Havilland Mosquito, a World War II combat aircraft
 Mozzie (White Collar), a character in the comedy drama series
 A Rainbow Six Siege operator
 An Australian term for mosquito

See also
Mosquito (disambiguation)
Mossie (disambiguation)
Mozzi (disambiguation)